Ľuboš Hajdúch (born 6 March 1980) is a Slovak football (soccer) retired goalkeeper.

Career

Club
On 27 July 2010, Hajdúch appeared as a trialist goalkeeper for St. Johnstone F.C. against Northern Irish part-time side Distillery Lisburn Distillery F.C. in which he held a clean sheet as Saints won the game 1–0. He played as the Saints management team look to bring in another goalkeeper to challenge Graeme Smith for a first team place following the departure of club legend Alan Main.

In January 2011, he joined LKS Nieciecza. He was released half-year later.

International
He was a part of Slovakia national football team, with which he has appeared five times.

References

External links
 
 

1980 births
Living people
People from Levice
Sportspeople from the Nitra Region
Slovak footballers
Association football goalkeepers
Slovakia international footballers
MFK Ružomberok players
Levadiakos F.C. players
Bruk-Bet Termalica Nieciecza players
Kaposvári Rákóczi FC players
Puskás Akadémia FC players
MFK Skalica players
Nemzeti Bajnokság I players
Slovak expatriate footballers
Expatriate footballers in Greece
Expatriate footballers in Poland
Expatriate footballers in Hungary
Slovak expatriate sportspeople in Greece
Slovak expatriate sportspeople in Poland
Slovak expatriate sportspeople in Hungary